Fleet Moss is a upland area separating Wharfedale from Wensleydale in North Yorkshire, England. Fleet Moss is noted for its peat blanket bog, which has been dated to the Neolithic period. The area is ombrotrophic; this means it needs rain, hail snow and fog for its nutrients. Fleet Moss is known as the most eroded blanket bog in all of Yorkshire; because of its observable damage, it is known colloquially as The Somme, and as such, is visible from space.

It is also known recreationally for the road which runs north/south through Fleet Moss between Oughtershaw and Gayle, which is the highest (paved) road in Yorkshire. Fleet Moss is a popular waypoint with cyclists and fell runners.

Description
The name Fleet Moss derives from Old Scandinavian, fljót mos, literally stream bog. Whilst this road connects with Cam Fell High Road at the northern end of Fleet Moss (originally the route of the turnpike between Richmond and Lancaster), the road past Fleet Moss from the south was only built in 1887. Fleet Moss itself, sits between Dodd Fell  to the west, and Jeffery Pot Hill  to the east, with Fleet Moss Tarn being its highest area.

Blanket bog
A cross-section of the peat contains the Glen Garry tephra layer, a sediment laid down by a volcanic event which provides a chronological marker. This proves that the first peat in the bog was laid down in the early to mid Neolithic period, around 4,000–2,000 BC. Before the bog was there, the site was part of an ancient woodland, most likely elm trees by carbon dating the pollen in the ground. This wood suffered disease and was progressively cleared by the people who lived in the area.

Manual drainage of the peatland was a normal agricultural practice, which involved creating ditches (called grips) that would drain off the water, (natural drainage channels are known as gullies). The moors were drained gradually, but from 1840 onwards, the individual pockets of land were purchased by one family, who set about draining them intensively. This process was increased dramatically in the 1950s to provide grazing land for cattle. The draining has created scarring  and columns of peat (hags) where the peat used to be, which has left the landscape looking akin to a war zone; so much so, that the location is known as The Somme and the distinctive features make it visible from space. Areas to the north east of Fleet Moss are used extensively for grazing animals and shooting, with the south western side of the site noted for its peatland.

Since 2017, Pennine PeatLIFE has been actively restoring blanket bogs in Northern England, including Fleet Moss. The programme has seen the installation of sediment traps and dams across  to prevent erosion and the run-off of acidic peaty water into streams and rivers. Rewetting of the bog also helps to prevent flooding in downstream areas.

Most water from Fleet Moss drains eastwards through Bardale, Cragdale and Roedale to feed Semerwater, however, some water spills east into the River Wharfe via Barden Beck. In extremes of rainfall, the peat-riddled water spills into the Wharfe via Oughtershaw Beck. All of these actions are making the waters in the rivers more acidic.

Flora and fauna
Plants present at Fleet Moss include Aulacomnium palustre, sphagnum moss, hare's-tail cottongrass, heather, Hypnum cupressiforme, bog asphodel, Racomitrium lanuginosum, sundew, Trichophorum cespitosum, bilberry, and cross-leaved heath.

Stonechat, curlew, dunlin, golden plover, short-eared owl, and white-throated dipper have been observed at Fleet Moss.

Stone working
There is evidence to show that during the Neolithic period, limestone pavements were cleared by those who lived in the area. This may have contributed to the development of the bog. Small-scale quarrying was undertaken in the area in post-Medieval times; thought this is though to have been for roads and walls near to, or on, Fleet Moss.

Fleet Moss Tarn
Mapping indicates that water from Fleet Moss Tarn flows north eastwards into Bardale Beck, which feeds into Semerwater. Fleet Moss Tarn is one of only a handful of natural lakes in the Yorkshire Dales (Malham Tarn, Semerwater, Birkdale Tarn, Eshton Tarn and Oughtershaw Tarn), as the underlying limestone is highly permeable. Where lakes do occur, is due to the underlying rocks being eroded to reveal impermeable rocks below.

The orchid, bog twayblade, was recorded at Fleet Moss Tarn in the 1870s.

Fleet Moss Road
The road over Fleet Moss between Oughtershaw in the south (Wharfedale), and Gayle in the north (Wensleydale), is well-known among cyclists for being a tough ascent from either direction. The pass regularly features in the best rides sections of newspapers and cycling magazines, and is also listed as being the highest paved road in Yorkshire.

The road by Fleet Moss is also a waypoint on the annual Fellsman race.

Notes

References

Sources

External links

Environment Agency catchment data for Raydale and the River Bain
Grips and Gully dam blocking of peatland
Ordnance Survey get outside details
Bikecation ascent details with gradients

Bogs of England
Yorkshire Dales
Mountains and hills of North Yorkshire
Landforms of North Yorkshire
Peaks of the Yorkshire Dales
Mountain passes of England